The Khugyani, Khogyani or Khogiani tribe is one of the Karlāṇī tribes of the Pashtun people. The tribe originated in the Khogyani district in Nangarhar province of Afghanistan. The Khogyani District is in eastern Nangarhar province of Afghanistan, near the city of Jalalabad and the Kōh-i-Safēd (White mountain range). 
  
Formerly, the tribe name Khakwani was widely used. It's still current in the Indian subcontinent.

Background 

The Khogyani tribal root is the Karlāṇī Pashtuns. In the folklore origin of the Karlāṇī tribal confederacy, of which the Khogyani form a part, Karlāṇī,the Karlāṇī branch of the Pashtuns descend. 

The Khogyani tribe itself consists of five clans: Mohsin zai, Daulat zai, Maroof zai, Saib zai and Chopan zai.

A mountain people, Khogianis were often embroiled in wars against the Shinwari and the Ghilzai tribes. The Karlāṇī tribes in general have a reputation amongst other Pashtun tribes as especially skilled fighters. The Karlāṇī themselves maintain that they have never been subjugated by a foreign power and that they continue to live their lives by unchanged, age-old tradition.

Emergence in the subcontinent 
The ancestors of this tribe came to the Indian subcontinent some 450 years ago. The first Khogyani tribal head was Malik Shahpal, who was invited to attend the royal court by Emperor Humayun. Shahpal founded the colony Kiri Afghana in Multan city. His tribe settled there and gained a substantial amount of power and influence.

Following Malik Shahpal, came Khudadad Khan from Ghazni. From the Chopanzai clan, he settled in the district of Multan. His descendants influenced the region, with the help of the Afghan rulers. When Multan was annexed with Afghanistan, Nawab Ali Mohammad Khan Khakwani was appointed as governor. He built the Mosque 'Ali Mohammad Khan'. Khogyani peoples continued to live around Multan, holding vast tracts of land with substantial holdings in Vehari, Shujaabad, Khanewal, Bahawalpur, Bahawalnagar, Dera Ghazi Khan, Dera Ismail Khan, Rahimyar Khan, and Layyah districts of Pakistan. They are still a wealthy and influential family, and the single largest landowners of their region.

During Pashtun rule
Multan during the Mughal Empire flourished and had good administrative control. However, as central control waned during the decline of the empire, it was ruled by the local Pashtun tribes. The Khogyani tribe had good relations with the Afghan Mughals, as well as the Bahawalpur state. Multan remained under the Khogyani for a long period of time. It is  believed that the Khogyani gave refuge to Ahmad Shāh Durrānī's mother. Ahmad Shāh Durrānī was born in Multan. Later, the Khogyani paid taxes to the central government in Kabul and remained the Nawabs for an extended period of time.

Other Karlāṇī tribes

Personalities 
Hazrat Chopan Khan Khogiani was a famous saint and his shrine is located in Ghazni.

Other people of note
 Nawab Ali Mohammad Khan Khakwani
 Nawab Haji Ghulam Mustafa Khan Khakwani
 Nawab Haji Ghulam Qadir Khan Khakwani
 Nawab Mohammad Yaar Khan Khakwani
 Nawab Hafiz Khuda Baksh Khan Khakwani
 Nawab Ahmad Yaar Khan Khakwani
 Nawab Hamid Yaar Khan Khakwani

See also
 Punjab
 History of Afghanistan
 History of Punjab
 History of Multan

References 

 ^ Muraqay Mooltani 
 ^ Punjab Chiefs 1940
 ^ Tareekh-e-Multan

Pashtun tribes
Ethnic groups in Afghanistan